Drawida polydiverticulata is a species of earthworm from family Moniligastridae found from shola grasslands of the Munnar region in Kerala.

Drawida polydiverticulata has multiple lobes, also called diverticulums; an organ located in the front of its body, are unique amongst the members of the genus.

References

Clitellata
Fauna of Kerala